Patricio "Pato" Garino Gullotta (born May 17, 1993) is an Argentine professional basketball player for Girona of the Liga ACB. He played college basketball for George Washington University. He also represents the senior Argentina national team. He is a 2.01 m (6'7") tall shooting guard-small forward.

Early career
Garino played basketball, football, and swimming in Mar del Plata. In 16, he moved to the United States. At the recommendation of then head coach Kevin Sutton, Garino attended Montverde Academy.  Garino lead the Eagles to a 23–4 overall record and a No. 9 ranking in the final ESPNHS Powerade Fab 50 in 2011–12.

College career
Following his high school coach, Garino spent four seasons at George Washington University. In his final season, he helped guide the Colonials to the 2016 NIT Championship and was named to the All-Tournament Team. He earned Atlantic 10 All-Defensive Team and the All-Conference Second Team honors after averaging 14.1 points, 4.2 rebounds, 1.5 assists, and 1.37 steals in 32.0 minutes while shooting .510 (203-398) from the field and .430 (58-135) from three-point range. He was named to the Atlantic 10 All-Defensive Team in each of his final three seasons. For his collegiate career, he averaged 12.0 points, 4.3 rebounds, 1.7 assists, and 1.71 steals in 30.1 minutes while shooting .508 (567-1,1167) from the field and .364 (102-280) from long range. He ranks third in school history on George Washington's career steals list (219) and is 11th all-time in scoring (1,536 points). Garino helped lead the team to the 2014 NCAA tournament and the championship of the 2016 NIT.

College statistics

|-
| style="text-align:left;" | 2012–13
| style="text-align:left;" | George Washington
| 30 || 30 || 26.9 || .427 || .286 || .648 || 3.4 || 2.1 || 2.3 || 0.4 || 8.8
|-
| style="text-align:left;" | 2013–14
| style="text-align:left;" | George Washington
| 26 || 14 || 28.7 || .561 || .343 || .593 || 4.4 || 2.0 || 1.6 || 0.8 || 12.1
|-
| style="text-align:left;" | 2014–15
| style="text-align:left;" | George Washington
| 35 || 35 || 31.6 || .531 || .296 || .735 || 5.3 || 1.5 || 1.7 || 0.8 || 12.4
|-
| style="text-align:left;" | 2015–16
| style="text-align:left;" | George Washington
| 38 || 38 || 32.0 || .510 || .430 || .689 || 4.2 || 1.5 || 1.4 || 0.8 || 14.1
|-

Professional career

Austin Spurs (2016–2017)
After going undrafted in the 2016 NBA draft, Garino joined the Orlando Magic for the 2016 NBA Summer League. On July 29, 2016, he signed with the San Antonio Spurs, but was waived on October 22 after appearing in four preseason games. Seven days later, he was acquired by the Austin Spurs of the NBA Development League as an affiliate of San Antonio.

Orlando Magic (2017)
On April 3, 2017, Garino signed with the Orlando Magic. He made his NBA debut the following night, recording one rebound in a 122–102 loss to the Cleveland Cavaliers. On August 1, 2017, he was waived by the Magic. He currently holds the record for most NBA minutes played (43) without a point scored.

Saski Baskonia (2017–2020)
On September 1, 2017, Garino signed a three-year deal with Baskonia. In his first season with the club, he made his debut in the 2017–18 EuroLeague season. He made 23 appearances, averaging 4.5 points and 1.7 rebounds per game. In 2018–19 EuroLeague season, he made 18 appearances and averaged 5.6 points and 1.4 rebounds per game.

Žalgiris Kaunas (2020–2021)
On July 22, 2020, he signed with Žalgiris Kaunas of the Lithuanian Basketball League (LKL) and the EuroLeague. In six games he averaged 3.5 points and 1.5 rebounds per game. On July 7, 2021, Garino officially parted ways with the Lithuanian club.

Nanterre 92 (2021–2022)
On August 18, 2021, Garino signed with Nanterre 92 of the LNB Pro A. In eight games, he averaged 4.0 points, 3.0 rebounds, 1.1 assists and 1.1 steals per game. On January 27, 2022, Garino parted ways with the team.

Basquet Girona (2022–present)
On July 16, 2022, he has signed with Girona of the LEB Oro.

National team career
Garino is a member of the senior Argentina national basketball team. He won a silver medal with Argentina's senior national team at the 2015 FIBA Americas Championship. He also played at the 2016 Summer Olympics, and at the 2017 FIBA AmeriCup.

In 2019, he participated in the team that won the Pan American gold medal in Lima. He was included in the Argentine squad for the 2019 FIBA Basketball World Cup and clinched the silver medal with Argentina, which emerged as runners-up to Spain at the 2019 FIBA Basketball World Cup.

Career statistics

NBA

Regular season

|-
| style="text-align:left;"| 
| style="text-align:left;"| Orlando
| 5 || 0 || 8.6 || .000 || .000 || .000 || 1.4 || .0 || .0 || .0 || .0
|- class="sortbottom"
| style="text-align:center;" colspan="2"| Career
| 5 || 0 || 8.6 || .000 || .000 || .000 || 1.4 || .0 || .0 || .0 || .0

EuroLeague

|-
| style="text-align:left;"| 2017–18
| style="text-align:left;" rowspan=2 | Baskonia
| 23 || 7 || 15.1 || .468 || .273 || .839 || 1.7 || .7 || 1.0 || .1 || 4.5 || 4.5
|-
| style="text-align:left;"| 2018–19
| 18 || 8 || 14.7 || .507 || .444 || .737 || 1.4 || .3 || .7 || .1 || 5.6 || 4.2
|- class="sortbottom"
| style="text-align:center;" colspan="2"| Career
| 41 || 15 || 14.9 || .486 || .379 || .800 || 1.6 || .5 || .9 || .1 || 5.0 || 4.4

Personal life
The son of Alicia Gullotta and Oscar Garino, he has two older sisters, Lorena and Natalia.

References

External links

 Liga ACB profile 
 euroleague.net profile
 fiba.com profile
 George Washington Colonials bio

1993 births
Living people
2019 FIBA Basketball World Cup players
Argentine expatriate basketball people in Lithuania
Argentine expatriate basketball people in Spain
Argentine expatriate basketball people in the United States
Argentine men's basketball players
Austin Spurs players
Basketball players at the 2016 Summer Olympics
Basketball players at the 2019 Pan American Games
Basketball players at the 2020 Summer Olympics
Bàsquet Girona players
BC Žalgiris players
George Washington Colonials men's basketball players
Italian men's basketball players
Liga ACB players
Medalists at the 2019 Pan American Games
Montverde Academy alumni
National Basketball Association players from Argentina
Orlando Magic players
Olympic basketball players of Argentina
Pan American Games gold medalists for Argentina
Pan American Games medalists in basketball
Saski Baskonia players
Shooting guards
Small forwards
Sportspeople from Mar del Plata
Undrafted National Basketball Association players